Arnold Jacob "Red" Auerbach (September 20, 1917 – October 28, 2006) was an American professional basketball coach and executive. He served as a head coach in the National Basketball Association (NBA), most notably with the Boston Celtics. Auerbach was also the head coach of the Washington Capitols and Tri-Cities Blackhawks.  As a coach, Auerbach set NBA records with 938 wins and nine championships. After his coaching retirement in 1966, he served as president and front office executive of the Celtics until his death. As general manager and team president of the Celtics, he won an additional seven NBA titles for a grand total of 16 in a span of 29 years, the most of any individual in NBA history, making him one of the most successful team officials in the history of North American professional sports.

Auerbach is remembered for being a pioneer of modern basketball, redefining basketball as a game dominated by team play and defense, and introducing the fast break as a potent offensive weapon. He coached many players who went on to be inducted into the Basketball Hall of Fame. Additionally, Auerbach was vital in breaking down color barriers in the NBA. He made history by drafting the first African-American NBA player, Chuck Cooper in 1950, introducing the first African-American starting five in 1964, and hiring Bill Russell as the first African-American head coach in North American sports in 1966. Famous for his polarizing nature, he was also well known for smoking a cigar when he thought a victory was assured, a habit that became, for many, "the ultimate symbol of victory" during his Boston tenure.

In 1967, the NBA Coach of the Year award, which he had won in 1965, was named the "Red Auerbach Trophy", and Auerbach was inducted into the Basketball Hall of Fame in 1969. In 1970, Auerbach was named President of the Boston Celtics, and first held the presidency from 1970–1997. In 2001, after having spent four years as the team's vice-chairman, he returned to the role of team president and served in that capacity until his death in 2006. In 1980, he was named the greatest coach in the history of the NBA by the Professional Basketball Writers Association of America, and was NBA Executive of the Year in 1980. In addition, Auerbach was voted one of the NBA 10 Greatest Coaches in history, inducted into the National Jewish Sports Hall of Fame, and honoured with a retired number 2 jersey in the TD Garden, the home of the Boston Celtics.

Early life
Arnold Jacob Auerbach was one of the four children of Marie and Hyman Auerbach. Hyman was a Russian-Jewish immigrant from Minsk, Russia, and Marie Auerbach, née Thompson, was American-born. Auerbach Sr. had left Russia when he was thirteen, and the couple owned a delicatessen store and later went into the dry-cleaning business. Auerbach spent his whole childhood in Williamsburg, Brooklyn, playing basketball. With his flaming red hair and fiery temper, Auerbach was soon nicknamed "Red."

Amid the Great Depression, Auerbach played basketball as a guard at PS 122 and in the Eastern District High School, where he was named "Second Team All-Brooklyn" by the World-Telegram in his senior year. After a season at Seth Low Junior College, Auerbach received an athletic scholarship to the basketball program of Bill Reinhart at George Washington University in Washington, D.C. Auerbach was a standout basketball player and graduated with a M.A. in 1941. In those years, Auerbach began to understand the importance of the fast break, appreciating how potent three charging attackers against two back-pedalling defenders could be.

First coaching years (1940–1950)
In 1940, Auerbach began coaching basketball at the St. Albans School and Roosevelt High School in Washington, D.C. Three years later, he joined the US Navy for three years, coaching the Navy basketball team in Norfolk. There, he caught the eye of Washington millionaire Mike Uline, who hired him to coach the Washington Capitols in the newly founded Basketball Association of America (BAA), a predecessor of the NBA.

In the 1946–47 BAA season, Auerbach led a fast break-oriented team built around early BAA star Bones McKinney and various ex-Navy players to a 49–11 win–loss record, including a standard-setting 17-game winning streak that stood as the single-season league record until 1969. In the playoffs, however, they were defeated by the Chicago Stags in six games.

The next year the Capitols went 28–20 but were eliminated from the playoffs in a one-game Western Division tie-breaker. In the 1948–49 BAA season, the Caps won their first fifteen games and finished the season at 38–22. The team reached the BAA Finals, but were beaten by the Minneapolis Lakers, who were led by Hall-of-Fame center George Mikan. In the next season, the BAA and the rival league National Basketball League merged to become the NBA, and Auerbach felt he had to rebuild his squad. However, owner Uline declined his proposals, and Auerbach resigned.

After leaving the Capitols, Auerbach became assistant coach of the Duke Blue Devils men's basketball team. It was assumed that Auerbach would take over for head coach Gerry Gerard, who was battling cancer. During his tenure at Duke, Auerbach regularly worked with future All-American Dick Groat. Auerbach later wrote that he "felt pretty bad waiting for [Gerard] to die" and that it was "no way to get a job".

Auerbach left Duke after a few months when Ben Kerner, owner of the Tri-Cities Blackhawks, gave him the green light to rebuild the team from scratch. Auerbach traded more than two dozen players in just six weeks, and the revamped Blackhawks improved, but ended the 1949–50 NBA season with a losing record of 28–29. When Kerner traded Auerbach's favourite player John Mahnken, an angry Auerbach resigned again.

In 1950, Auerbach took a position as the athletic director of Kutsher's Hotel in the Catskills, NY. Kutsher's was the center of a summertime basketball league, and players from the New York City area would participate, playing for one of several local country clubs and hotels.

Boston Celtics (1950–2006)

Early years (1950–56)
Prior to the 1950–51 NBA season, Walter Brown, owner of the Boston Celtics, was desperate to turn around his struggling and financially strapped franchise, which was reeling from a 22–46 record. Brown, in characteristic candor, said to a gathering of local Boston sportswriters, "Boys, I don't know anything about basketball. Who would you recommend I hire as coach?"  The group vociferously answered that he get the recently available Auerbach, and Brown complied. In the 1950 NBA draft, Auerbach made some notable moves. First, he famously snubbed Hall-of-Fame New England point guard Bob Cousy in the 1950 NBA draft, infuriating the Boston crowd. He argued that the flashy Cousy lacked the poise necessary to make his team, taunting him as a "local yokel". Second, he drafted African-American Chuck Cooper, the first black player to be drafted by an NBA club. With that, Auerbach effectively broke down the color barrier in professional basketball.

In that year, the core of the Celtics consisted of Hall-of-Fame center Ed Macauley, Auerbach's old favorite McKinney, and an unlikely addition, Cousy. Cousy had refused to report to the club that had drafted him (which happened to be the Blackhawks, Auerbach's old club), and because his next team (the Chicago Stags) folded, he ended up with the Celtics. With Auerbach's fast-break tactics, the Celtics achieved a 39–30 record but lost in the 1951 NBA Playoffs to the New York Knicks. However, the relationship between Auerbach and Cousy improved when the coach saw that the "Houdini of the Hardwood"—as the spectacular dribbler and flashy passer Cousy was lovingly called—became the first great playmaker of the fledgling NBA.

In the following 1951–52 NBA season, Auerbach made a remarkable draft pick of future Hall-of-Fame guard Bill Sharman. With the high-scoring Macauley, elite passer Cousy, and new prodigy Sharman, Auerbach had a core that provided high-octane fast-break basketball. Other notable players who joined the Celtics were the forwards Frank Ramsey and Jim Loscutoff. Until 1956, the Celtics would make the playoffs every year, but never won the title. In fact, the Celtics often choked in the playoffs, going a mere 10–17 in the postseason from 1951 through 1956. As Cousy put it: "We would get tired in the end and could not get the ball." As a result, Auerbach sought a defensive big man who could get easy rebounds, initiate fast breaks, and close out games.

Dynasty years (1956–66)

Before the 1956 NBA draft, Auerbach had already set his sights on defensive rebounding center Bill Russell. Via a draft-day trade that sent Macauley and rookie Cliff Hagan to the rival St. Louis Hawks (Kerner had moved the Blackhawks to St. Louis), he acquired a center in Russell, who would go on to become one of the greatest basketball players of all time. In the same draft, Auerbach picked up forward Tom Heinsohn and guard K.C. Jones, also two future Hall-of-Famers. Emphasising team play rather than individual performances, and stressing that defence was more important than offence, Auerbach drilled his players to play tough defense and force opposing turnovers for easy fast-break points. Forward Tom Sanders recalled that the teams were also regularly among the best-conditioned and toughest squads.

Anchored by defensive stalwart Russell, the tough Celtics forced their opponents to take low-percentage shots from farther distances (there was no three-point arc at the time); misses were then often grabbed by perennial rebounding champion Russell, who then either passed it on to elite fast-break distributor Cousy or made the outlet pass himself, providing their sprinting colleagues opportunities for an easy slam dunk or layup. Auerbach also emphasised the need for role players like Frank Ramsey and John Havlicek, who became two of the first legitimate sixth men in NBA history, a role later played by Don Nelson. Auerbach's recipe proved devastating to the opposition. From 1957 to 1966, the Celtics won nine of ten NBA championships. This included eight consecutive championships—which is the longest championship streak in North American sports—and six victories over the Los Angeles Lakers of Hall-of-Famers Elgin Baylor and Jerry West in the NBA Finals. The streak also denied perennial scoring and rebounding champion Wilt Chamberlain a title during Auerbach's coaching reign.

Flowing from Auerbach's emphasis on teamwork, what was also striking about his teams was that they never seemed to have a dominant scorer: in the 1960–61 NBA season, for instance, the Celtics had six players who scored between 15 and 21 points per game, but none made the Top 10 scoring list. In 1964, he sent out the first-ever NBA starting five consisting of an African-American quintet, namely Russell, Willie Naulls, Tom Sanders, Sam Jones, and K. C. Jones. Auerbach would go a step further in the 1966–67 NBA season, when he stepped down after winning nine titles in 11 years, and made Bill Russell player-coach. Auerbach also popularised smoking a victory cigar whenever he thought a game was already decided, a habit that became cult-like in popularity in the Boston area. Furthermore, having acquired a reputation as a fierce competitor, he often got into verbal altercations with officials, receiving more fines and getting ejected more often than any other coach in NBA history.

All in all, Auerbach directly coached nine NBA championship teams and mentored four players—Russell, Sharman, Heinsohn, and K.C. Jones—who would go on to win an additional seven NBA championships as coaches (two each for Russell, Heinsohn and Jones, all with the Celtics, and one for Sharman with the Lakers). Thirteen players who played for Auerbach have been inducted into the Basketball Hall of Fame—Macauley, Ramsey, Cousy, Sharman, Heinsohn, Clyde Lovellette, Arnie Risen, Andy Phillip, John R. Thompson (as a coach), Russell, K. C. Jones, Havlicek, and Sam Jones. Although Don Nelson played for Auerbach only during his last year as coach, his influence was profound: Nelson would later join Auerbach as one of the 10 Greatest Coaches in NBA history. Sharman and Heinsohn would become two of only four people to be inducted into the Hall of Fame as both a player and a coach. Few if any coaches can match Auerbach's record of wins and successful mentorship of his players.

General manager (1966–84)
Prior to the 1965–66 NBA season, Auerbach announced the coming year would be his last as coach, stating to the rest of the league, "This is your chance to take your last shot at me." After losing game 1 of the 1966 finals to the Lakers, he publicly named his successor, center Bill Russell. The Celtics won the series in seven games, sending Auerbach out on top. Russell then took over as a player-coach, and so became the first African-American head coach ever in the four major North American professional team sports. While his pupil led the Celtics to two further titles in 1968 and 1969, Auerbach rebuilt the aging Celtics with shrewd draft picks, among them future Hall-of-Famers Dave Cowens and Jo Jo White, as well as Paul Westphal and Don Chaney. With his ex-player Tom Heinsohn coaching the Celtics and led by former sixth man John Havlicek, Auerbach's new recruits won the Atlantic Division every year from 1972 to 1976, winning the NBA title in 1974 and 1976. Auerbach also signed veteran forward/center Paul Silas and ex-ABA star Charles Scott.

However, Auerbach could not prevent the Celtics from going into a slump at the end of the 1970s. He traded away both Silas and Westphal because they wanted salary increases that would have made them higher earners than the best player on the Celtics (Cowens), which was not acceptable to Auerbach. While the Westphal trade to the Phoenix Suns in exchange for Charlie Scott was considered a success due to the Celtics' 13th title in 1976, Auerbach later admitted he erred in letting Silas go, even after Cowens personally begged him to give Silas a new deal. When Havlicek retired in 1978, the Celtics went 61–103 in two seasons. In the summer of 1978, after the worst in a string of contentious clashes with several different owners after Walter Brown's passing in 1964, Auerbach hopped into a taxi to take him to Logan Airport, where he was to board a flight to New York to consider a lucrative contract offer from Knicks owner Sonny Werblin. However, the cab driver pleaded with him to stay, emphasizing how much Bostonians loved him and considered him family. Soon after, heading a team press conference, and with his typical bravado, Auerbach puffed on his trademark cigar and stated simply, "I'm not going anywhere.  We're going to sign Larry Bird, and we're going to be on top again." Despite knowing that Bird, a talented young player from unheralded Indiana State, had a year of college eligibility remaining, he had drafted Bird as a junior eligible in the 1978 NBA draft and waited for a year until the future Hall-of-Fame forward Bird arrived, finally setting aside his team salary rules when it became clear that his choices were paying Bird a record-setting rookie salary or watch him simply re-enter the 1979 draft. Bird then became the highest-paid Celtic as a rookie, with a $650,000-per year deal. Auerbach knew that the brilliant, hardworking Bird would be the cornerstone of a new Celtics generation.

In 1980, Auerbach achieved another great coup, which was dubbed "The Steal of The Century". He convinced the Golden State Warriors to trade him a #3 overall pick and future Hall-of-Fame center Robert Parish in exchange for two picks in the 1980 NBA draft: #1 overall Joe Barry Carroll and the #13 pick Rickey Brown. With the #3 pick, Auerbach selected the player he most wanted in the draft, Kevin McHale, who would also be inducted into the Hall of Fame. The frontcourt of Parish-McHale-Bird became one of the greatest front lines in NBA history. Auerbach hired head coach Bill Fitch who led the revamped Celtics to the 1981 title.

In 1983, Auerbach named former Celtics player K.C. Jones coach of the Celtics. Starting in 1984, Jones coached the Celtics to four straight appearances in the NBA Finals, winning championships in 1984 and 1986.

Auerbach as a part-time side gig was the colour analyst on NBA and college basketball games for TBS sports from 1982–87.

President and vice chairman (1984–2006)
In 1984, after he relinquished his general managing duties to Jan Volk, Auerbach focused on continuing as president and later vice-chairman of the Boston Celtics. In a surprising move after winning their 15th title, he traded popular guard Gerald Henderson, the game-2 hero in the finals against the Lakers, for Seattle's first-round draft pick in 1986. Two years later, after the Celtics defeated Houston in the finals for their 16th championship, he used the second overall pick in the 1986 draft, the pick acquired from Seattle, to take college prodigy Len Bias from Maryland, arguably the most brilliant coup in Auerbach's stellar career. With the team's star players still in their prime, the defending champions appeared set to compete at the top for years. However, tragedy struck just two days later, when Bias died of a cocaine overdose. Several years later, Celtics star player Reggie Lewis died suddenly in 1993, and without any league compensation for either loss, the team fell into decline, not seeing another Finals in Auerbach's lifetime.

In an interview, Auerbach confessed that he lost interest in big-time managing in the early 1990s, preferring to stay in the background and concentrating on his pastimes, racquetball and his beloved cigar-smoking. He would, however, stay on with the Celtics as president until 1997, as vice chairman until 2001, and then became president again, a position he held until his death, although in his final years, he was weakened by heart problems and often used a wheelchair.

Personal life

Auerbach was one of four children of American-born Marie Auerbach and Russian Jewish immigrant Hyman Auerbach in Brooklyn. His brother Zang Auerbach, four years his junior, was a respected cartoonist and portraitist at the Washington Star. He married Dorothy Lewis in the spring of 1941. The couple had two daughters, Nancy and Randy. They also helped raise Nancy’s daughter Julie.  

Auerbach was known for his love for cigar smoking. Because Auerbach made his victory cigars a cult in the 1960s, Boston restaurants would often say "no cigar or pipe smoking, except for Red Auerbach". In addition, Auerbach was well known for his love of Chinese food. In an interview shortly before his death, he explained that since the 1950s, Chinese takeout was the most convenient nutrition: back then, NBA teams travelled on regular flights and had a tight time schedule, so filling up the stomach with heavier non-Chinese food meant wasting time and risking travel-sickness. Over the years, Auerbach became so fond of this food that he even became a part-owner of a Chinese restaurant in Boston. Despite a heart operation, he remained active in his 80s, playing racquetball and making frequent public appearances.

Despite his fierce nature, Auerbach was popular among his players. He recalled that on his 75th birthday party, 45 of his former players showed up; and when he turned 80, his perennial 1960s victim Wilt Chamberlain showed up, a gesture which Auerbach dearly appreciated.

In an interview with ESPN, Auerbach stated that his all-star fantasy team would consist of Bill Russell—who in the former's opinion was the ultimate player to start a franchise with—as well as Bob Pettit, Elgin Baylor, Oscar Robertson and Jerry West, with John Havlicek as the sixth man. Regarding greatest basketballers of all time, Auerbach's candidates were Russell, Larry Bird, Magic Johnson, Kareem Abdul-Jabbar, Michael Jordan."

Death
Auerbach died of a heart attack on October 28, 2006, at the age of 89. NBA commissioner David Stern said, "the void caused by his death will never be filled" and players Bill Russell, K.C. Jones, John Havlicek and Larry Bird, as well as contemporaries like Jerry West, Pat Riley, and Wayne Embry universally hailed Auerbach as one of the greatest personalities in NBA history. Bird stated "Red shared our passion for the game, our commitment to excellence, and our desire to do whatever it takes to win." Auerbach was survived by his daughters, Nancy, Randy, Julie, and Julie’s children Peter, Hope, and Noelle. Auerbach was interred in Falls Church, Virginia at King David Memorial Gardens within National Memorial Park on October 31, 2006. Attendees included basketball dignitaries Bill Russell, Kevin McHale, Danny Ainge, and David Stern.

During the 2006–07 NBA season, NBA TV and NBA.com aired reruns of Auerbach's four-minute instructional videos known as "Red on Roundball" previously aired during NBA on CBS halftime shows in the 1970s and 1980s, and as a testament to his importance in the Boston sports world, the Boston Red Sox honored Auerbach at their April 20, 2007 game against the New York Yankees by wearing green uniforms and by hanging replicated Celtics championship banners on the "Green Monster" at Fenway Park. Boston won 7–6.

Prior to Boston's season opener against the Wizards, his signature was officially placed on the parquet floor near center court, thereby naming the court as "Red Auerbach Parquet Floor." The ceremony was attended by his daughter Randy and some of the Celtics legends. The signature replaced the Red Auerbach memorial logo used during the 2007 season.

Writing
Auerbach was the author of seven books. His first, Basketball for the Player, the Fan and Coach, has been translated into seven languages and is the best-selling basketball book in print. His second book, co-authored with Paul Sann, was Winning the Hard Way. He also wrote a pair of books with Joe Fitzgerald: Red Auerbach: An Autobiography and Red Auerbach On and Off the Court. In October 1991 M.B.A.: Management by Auerbach was co-authored with Ken Dooley. In 1994, Seeing Red was written with Dan Shaughnessy. In October 2004, his last book, Let Me Tell You a Story, was co-authored with sports journalist John Feinstein.

Legacy

Among Auerbach's accomplishments during his 20-year professional coaching career were eleven Eastern Division titles (including nine in a row from 1957–65), eleven appearances in the finals (including ten in a row from 1957–66), and nine NBA championships. With a total of sixteen NBA championship rings in a span of 29 years (1957–86) as the Celtics coach, general manager, and team president, Auerbach is the most successful team official in NBA history. He is credited with creating several generations of championship Boston Celtics teams, including the first Celtics dynasty with Bill Russell, which won an NBA record eight titles in a row (1959–66). As Celtics general manager, he created championship-winning teams around Hall-of-Famers Dave Cowens and John Havlicek in the 1970s and Larry Bird in the 1980s.

In addition to coaching, Auerbach was a highly effective mentor; several players coached by Auerbach would become successful coaches themselves. Bill Russell won two titles as Auerbach's successor, Tom Heinsohn won a pair of championships as a Celtics coach in the 1970s, K.C. Jones led the Celtics to two further titles in the 1980s, and Bill Sharman coached the Los Angeles Lakers to their first title in 1972. In addition, prototypical sixth man Don Nelson had a highly successful coaching career and joined his mentor Auerbach as one of 10 Greatest Coaches in NBA history. Outside the NBA, former Auerbach pupil John Thompson became a highly successful college coach with the Georgetown Hoyas, leading the team to the 1984 NCAA championship and mentored Hall of Fame players Patrick Ewing, Dikembe Mutombo, Alonzo Mourning, and Allen Iverson.

Throughout his coaching tenure in Boston, Auerbach served several other roles including, but not limited to, general manager, head of scouting, personnel director and travel agent. In the early offseasons, he would take the Celtics on barnstorming tours around New England, promoting the still fledgling NBA. At the end of every season, regardless of their on-court success, he approached owner Brown and ask, "Walter, are our last paychecks going to clear?" to which Brown would always positively respond, and they would. Despite Brown's own close association with the NHL's Boston Bruins, whose owners also possessed the Boston Garden, the Celtics were fleeced on concessions and profits as tenants. During this era, when most team owners not only thought of, but also treated their players as cattle and/or slaves, athletes from all the four major professional sports leagues were fighting for their rights and economic fairness. As Auerbach represented management of the Celtics, team members frustrated with their salaries had only him to complain to, or about, in their role in the formation of the players' union. These interpersonal dynamics are construed as follows by journalist David Halberstam:

Pertaining to the above, Walter Brown was not rich; also that as Auerbach was as tough at the negotiating table as he was on the practice court and in the locker room, it was always for the purpose of getting the most out of his players. In the summer of 1984, with much trepidation, Auerbach reluctantly signed former finals MVP Cedric Maxwell to a lucrative guaranteed contract to stay with the Celtics. Then, Auerbach's worst fears came true when Maxwell arrived that fall out of shape, and, suffering from various injuries, provided little contribution as the team lost a playoff for the first time ever to the Lakers in the 1985 Finals.  Two subsequent facts are perhaps most relevant in evaluating Auerbach's legacy: First, he was able to trade Maxwell to San Diego in exchange for former MVP Bill Walton, who was a major contributor to the team winning its 16th title in 1986, the last of Auerbach's career. Second, Maxwell continues to be embraced as a beloved member of the Celtics family, including having his number retired alongside the team's legendary greats.

In Auerbach's honor, the Celtics have retired a number-2 jersey with the name "AUERBACH", memorializing his role as the second most important Celtic ever, behind founder Walter Brown, in whose honor the number-1 "BROWN" jersey is retired.

His story is documented in The First Basket, the first and most comprehensive documentary on the history of Jews and Basketball. He is also featured as an interview subject for the film.

Coaching pioneer
From his early days, Auerbach was convinced that the fast break, where a team used a quick outlet pass to fast guards who run downcourt and score before the opponent had re-established position, was a potent tactical weapon. This new strategy proved lethal for the opposition. Further, Auerbach moved emphasis away from individual accolades and instilled the teamwork element into his players. He also invented the concept of the role player and of the sixth man, stating: "Individual honors are nice, but no Celtic has ever gone out of his way to achieve them. We have never had the league's top scorer. In fact, we won seven league championships without placing even one among the league's top 10 scorers. Our pride was never rooted in statistics."

While Auerbach was not known for his tactical bandwidth, famously restricting his teams to just seven plays, he was well known for his psychological warfare, often provoking opposing players and officials with unabashed trash talk. For his fiery temper, he was ejected more often and received more fines than any other coach in NBA history. Age did nothing to diminish his fire; in 1983, after star Larry Bird was ejected from a preseason game against Philadelphia at the Garden along with the Sixers' role player Marc Iavaroni, Auerbach stormed onto the court and after taking the officials to task, screamed nose-to-nose with the 6'10" 260-pound Moses Malone. Concerning his own team, Auerbach was softer. Earl Lloyd, the first black player to play in the NBA, said: "Red Auerbach convinced his players that he loved them ... so all they wanted to do was please him."

No color barrier
Auerbach was known for choosing players for talent and motivation, with disregard for skin colour or ethnicity. In 1950, he made NBA history by drafting the league's first African-American player Chuck Cooper. He constantly added new black players to his squad, including Bill Russell, Satch Sanders, Sam Jones, K. C. Jones, and Willie Naulls. In 1964, these five players became the first African-American starting five in the NBA. When Auerbach gave up coaching to become the Celtics general manager in 1966, he appointed Bill Russell as his successor. Russell became the first black NBA coach, and was the first black coach of a professional sports organisation since Fritz Pollard in 1925. As the Celtics general manager in the 1980s, Auerbach fielded an earnest, hardworking team that was derided as being "too white". While the 1980s Celtics were not predominantly white or black, the NBA at the time was predominately black. White players like Larry Bird, Kevin McHale, Danny Ainge, and Bill Walton played alongside Tiny Archibald, Dennis Johnson, Robert Parish, and Cedric Maxwell to bring three more championships in the 1980s under coaches Bill Fitch (white) and Jones (black).

Arnold "Red" Auerbach Award
To honour Auerbach, the Celtics created the Arnold "Red" Auerbach award in 2006. It is an award given annually to the current Celtic player or coach who "best exemplifies the spirit and meaning of a true Celtic."

NBA Coach of the Year Award
The NBA gives out an annual coach of the year award to honor the league's best coach as voted by a panel of sportswriters. The trophy is named the 'Red Auerbach trophy' and has a figure of Auerbach sitting on a bench.

NBA coach statistics

|-
| align="left" |Washington
| align="left" |
|60||49||11||||align="center" |1st in Eastern||6||2||4||
| align="center" |Lost in BAA semifinals
|-
| align="left" |Washington
| align="left" |
|48||28||20||||align="center" |2nd in Western (tie)||-||-||-||
| align="center" |Lost division tiebreaker
|-
| align="left" |Washington
| align="left" |
|60||38||22||||align="center" |2nd in Eastern||2||6||5||
| align="center" |Lost in BAA Finals
|-
| align="left" |Tri-Cities
| align="left" |
|57||28||29||||align="center" |2nd in Eastern||3||1||2||
| align="center" |Lost in Div. semifinals
|-
| align="left" |Boston
| align="left" |
|69||39||30||||align="center" |2nd in Eastern||2||0||2||
| align="center" |Lost in Div. semifinals
|-
| align="left" |Boston
| align="left" |
|66||39||27||||align="center" |2nd in Eastern||3||1||2||
| align="center" |Lost in Div. semifinals
|-
| align="left" |Boston
| align="left" |
|71||46||25||||align="center" |3rd in Eastern||6||3||3||
| align="center" |Lost in Div. Finals
|-
| align="left" |Boston
| align="left" |
|72||42||30||||align="center" |3rd in Eastern||2||0||2||
| align="center" |Lost in Div. Finals
|-
| align="left" |Boston
| align="left" |
|72||36||36||||align="center" |4th in Eastern||7||3||4||
| align="center" |Lost in Div. Finals
|-
| align="left" |Boston
| align="left" |
|72||39||33||||align="center" |2nd in Eastern||3||1||2||
| align="center" |Lost in Div. semifinals
|-! style="background:#FDE910;"
| align="left" |Boston
| align="left" |
|72||44||28||||align="center" |1st in Eastern||10||7||3||
| align="center" |Won NBA Champions
|-
| align="left" |Boston
| align="left" |
|72||49||23||||align="center" |1st in Eastern||11||6||5||
| align="center" |Lost in NBA Finals
|-! style="background:#FDE910;"
| align="left" |Boston
| align="left" |
|72||52||20||||align="center" |1st in Eastern||11||8||3||
| align="center" |Won NBA Champions
|-! style="background:#FDE910;"
| align="left" |Boston
| align="left" |
|75||59||16||||align="center" |1st in Eastern||13||8||5||
| align="center" |Won NBA Champions
|-! style="background:#FDE910;"
| align="left" |Boston
| align="left" |
|79||57||22||||align="center" |1st in Eastern||10||8||2||
| align="center" |Won NBA Champions
|-! style="background:#FDE910;"
| align="left" |Boston
| align="left" |
|80||60||20||||align="center" |1st in Eastern||14||8||6||
| align="center" |Won NBA Champions
|-! style="background:#FDE910;"
| align="left" |Boston
| align="left" |
|80||58||22||||align="center" |1st in Eastern||13||8||5||
| align="center" |Won NBA Champions
|-! style="background:#FDE910;"
| align="left" |Boston
| align="left" |
|80||59||21||||align="center" |1st in Eastern||10||8||2||
| align="center" |Won NBA Champions
|-! style="background:#FDE910;"
| align="left" |Boston
| align="left" |
|80||62||18||||align="center" |1st in Eastern||12||8||4||
| align="center" |Won NBA Champions
|-! style="background:#FDE910;"
| align="left" |Boston
| align="left" |
|80||54||26||||align="center" |2nd in Eastern||17||11||6||
| align="center" |Won NBA Champions
|-class="sortbottom"
| align="left" |Career
|||1417||938||479||||||168||99||69||

See also
The First Basket
List of select Jewish basketball players
List of NBA championship head coaches
Statue of Red Auerbach

References

Notes

 Obituary (January 19, 2007), Jewish Chronicle, p. 45
Halberstam, David. The Breaks of the Game. Random House. 1981

External links

 
 Info page from Boston Celtics official site
 
 Coaching statistics at basketball-reference.com

1917 births
2006 deaths
American men's basketball coaches
American men's basketball players
American people of Russian-Jewish descent
Basketball coaches from New York (state)
Basketball players from New York City
Boston Celtics executives
Boston Celtics head coaches
Eastern District High School alumni
Guards (basketball)
George Washington Colonials men's basketball players
High school basketball coaches in Washington, D.C.
International Jewish Sports Hall of Fame inductees
Jewish American sportspeople
Jewish men's basketball players
Junior college men's basketball players in the United States
Naismith Memorial Basketball Hall of Fame inductees
National Basketball Association broadcasters
National Basketball Association championship-winning head coaches
National Basketball Association general managers
National Basketball Association team presidents
People from Williamsburg, Brooklyn
Sportspeople from Brooklyn
Tri-Cities Blackhawks head coaches
Washington Capitols coaches
United States Navy personnel of World War II